Parapet Peak is a  mountain summit located in British Columbia, Canada.

Description
Parapet Peak is set within Garibaldi Provincial Park and is part of the Garibaldi Ranges of the Coast Mountains. Precipitation runoff and glacial meltwater from the south side of the peak drains into the headwaters of the Pitt River, whereas the northern slope drains to Cheakamus Lake via Isosceles Creek. Topographic relief is significant as the summit rises 1,260 meters (4,134 feet) above Pitt River in 3 kilometers (1.9 miles).

History
The first ascent of Parapet Peak was made in August 1922 by Don Munday, his wife Phyllis Munday, Neal Carter, Harold O'Connor, and Clausen Thompson. The mountain's toponym was officially adopted on September 2, 1930, by the Geographical Names Board of Canada.

Climate

Based on the Köppen climate classification, Parapet Peak is located in the marine west coast climate zone of western North America. Most weather fronts originate in the Pacific Ocean and travel east toward the Coast Mountains where they are forced upward by the range (orographic lift), causing them to drop their moisture in the form of rain or snowfall. As a result, the Coast Mountains experience high precipitation, especially during the winter months in the form of snowfall. Winter temperatures can drop below −20 °C with wind chill factors below −30 °C. This climate supports the Isosceles Glacier on the east slope, the Gray Glacier on the north slope, and an unnamed glacier on the west slope of the peak.

See also
 
 Geography of British Columbia

References

External links
 Parapet Peak: Weather forecast
 Parapet Peak (photo): Flickr
 Parapet and Isosceles from Whirlwind: Flickr (photo)

Garibaldi Ranges
Two-thousanders of British Columbia
Sea-to-Sky Corridor
New Westminster Land District
Coast Mountains